Calileptoneta is a genus of North American Leptonetids that was first described by Norman I. Platnick in 1986.

Species
 it contains nine species, all found in the United States:
Calileptoneta briggsi Ledford, 2004 – USA
Calileptoneta californica (Banks, 1904) – USA
Calileptoneta cokendolpheri Ledford, 2004 – USA
Calileptoneta helferi (Gertsch, 1974) – USA
Calileptoneta noyoana (Gertsch, 1974) – USA
Calileptoneta oasa (Gertsch, 1974) (type) – USA
Calileptoneta sylva (Chamberlin & Ivie, 1942) – USA
Calileptoneta ubicki Ledford, 2004 – USA
Calileptoneta wapiti (Gertsch, 1974) – USA

See also
 List of Leptonetidae species

References

Araneomorphae genera
Leptonetidae
Spiders of the United States